Paul David Cunningham (born 18 June 1986) is a New Zealand former professional soccer player who plays for Kaitake FC as a defender.

Career

West Virginia Mountaineers
Cunningham earned a soccer scholarship to West Virginia University, a Division I school in the Big East Conference, and played college soccer with the West Virginia Mountaineers, for 4 years.

Fisher Athletic
Following the completion of his studies, Cunningham played professionally in England for Fisher Athletic.

Sorrento
He later joined Australian side Sorrento and played for 8 months.

Balestier Khalsa
He moved to S.League club Balestier Khalsa for the 2010 season.

In 2011, Cunningham was named club captain of Balestier and led them to a record finish in the 2013 S.League season. Cunningham was 1 of 5 players shortlisted for Player of the Season in 2013 and eventually lost out to Korean Marquee signing Lee Kwan Woo. Cunningham was also approached by Perth Glory FC to play for them that season but rejected after discussion with Balestier chairman, Thavaneson.

Cunningham has stated that he wants to play for Singapore at international level.

Following a contract dispute between Cunningham and Balestier at the end of the 2014 season, where Cunningham was only offered a 15-day extension to his contract allowing him to lead the Tigers out for the Singapore Cup final, the 5-year association between club and player ended on a sour note. Cunningham continued to train in the lead up to the final, which Balestier won, after he rejected the contract.

Team Taranaki
In 2015, Cunningham signed for Team Taranaki, an amateur association football club based in the Taranaki region, New Zealand. Despite interest from various overseas professional clubs, he and his wife Sarah made the decision to return to Taranaki as they look forward to settling back in New Zealand.

Later career
In September 2019 Cunningham was playing for Kaitake FC.

Honours
Balestier Khalsa
 Singapore Cup: 2014
 League Cup: 2013

References

1986 births
Living people
New Zealand association footballers
Fisher Athletic F.C. players
New Zealand expatriate association footballers
New Zealand expatriate sportspeople in England
New Zealand expatriate sportspeople in Australia
Expatriate footballers in England
Expatriate soccer players in Australia
Balestier Khalsa FC players
New Zealand expatriate sportspeople in Singapore
Expatriate footballers in Singapore
Singapore Premier League players
Association football defenders